Benny Green (born April 4, 1963) is an American hard bop jazz pianist who was a member of Art Blakey's Jazz Messengers. He has been compared to Bud Powell and Oscar Peterson in style and counts them as influences.

Biography
Green was born in New York City. He grew up in Berkeley, California, and studied classical piano from the age of seven. He was also interested in jazz from an early point, as his father was a jazz tenor saxophone player. Benny Green was "discovered" by Faye Carroll, and while still in his teens worked in a quintet led by Eddie Henderson. Green attended Berkeley High School, and participated in the school's jazz ensemble. In the later years of his high school career, he had a weekly trio gig at Yoshi's, which was his entrance to the world of professional jazz. After high school, he spent time in San Francisco, but became more successful on his return to New York.

Green joined Betty Carter's band in April, 1983, and since 1991 he has led his own trio. He has recorded for Blue Note, Telarc, and Criss Cross.

Green frequently teaches in workshops across the United States, such as Jazz Camp West in California, and Centrum/Jazz Port Townsend in Washington. He currently resides in the United States and tours globally with his trio. Then and Now is a studio album recorded and released in 2018 by Sunnyside Records.

Discography

As leader

Main sources:

As sideman
With Art Blakey
 Not Yet (Soul Note, 1988)
 I Get a Kick Out of Bu (Soul Note, 1988)

With Bob Belden
 Straight to My Heart: The Music of Sting (1989)
 When the Doves Cry: The Music of Prince (1993)

With Don Braden
 Quintet Time Is Now (1991)
 Wish List (1991)

With Cecil Brooks III
Hangin' with Smooth (Muse, 1990)
 Our Mister Brooks (2000)

With Ray Brown
 Bass Face (1993)
 Don't Get Sassy (1994)
 Some of My Best Friends Are...The Piano Players (1994)
 Some of My Best Friends Are...The Sax Players (1995)
 Seven Steps to Heaven (1995)
 Live at Scullers Jazz Club (1996)
 SuperBass (1997)
 Triple Play (compilation) (1998)
 Walk On (2003)

With Arnett Cobb
 Tenor Tribute, Vol. 1 (1988)
 Tenor Tribute, Vol. 2 (1988)

With Freddie Hubbard
 Topsy - Standard Book (1989)
 Live at Fat Tuesday's (1991)
 God Bless the Child (1998)

With Etta Jones
Reverse the Charges (Muse, 1992)
At Last (Muse, 1995)
 My Gentleman Friend (Muse, 1994 [1996])

With Ralph Moore
Round Trip (Reservoir, 1985 [1987])
Images (Landmark, 1989)
 Furthermore (Landmark, 1990)
 Who It is You Are (1993)

With Houston Person
The Lion and His Pride (Muse, 1991 [1994])
Christmas with Houston Person and Friends (Muse, 1994)
 A Little Houston on the Side (1999)

With Jimmy Ponder
 Soul Eyes (1991)
 Steel City Soul (1998)

With Jim Snidero
 Mixed Bag (1987)
 Blue Afternoon (1989)
 While You Were Here (1991)

With Lew Tabackin
 Ill Be Seeing You (1992)
 What a Little Moonlight Can Do (1994)

With Jack Walrath
Out of the Tradition (Muse, 1990 [1992])
 I Am the Walrath (2000)

With others
 Gary Bartz Shadows (1991)
 Block 16 Morning Sun Remixed (2002)
 Betty Carter Look What I Got! (1988)
 Anat Cohen Clarinetwork: Live at the Village Vanguard (2010)
 Mark Elf Minor Scramble (1996)
 Larry Gales Message from Monk (1990)
 Tim Hagans Hub Songs: The Music of Freddie... (1997)
 Jay Hoggard Little Tiger (1990)
 Fred Horn Steady Freddy Collective Cuts (1995)
 Jazz Futures Live in Concert (1991)
 Milt Jackson Burnin in the Woodhouse (1995)
 Ron Jackson Guitar Thing (1991)
 Randy Johnston, Walk On (Muse, 1992)
 Vince Jones One Day Spent (1991)
 Kristin Korb Introducing Kristin Korb With the... (1996)
 Diana Krall All for You (1995)
 Michael Logan Night Out (1990)
 Brian Lynch In Process (1991)
 Mingus Dynasty Next Generation Performs Charles... (1991)
 Mark Murphy Dim the Lights (2004)
 Amani A. W. Murray Amani A. W. Murray (1990)
 Randy Napoleon Between Friends (2006)
 Oscar Peterson Oscar Peterson & Benny Green (1998)
 Flip Phillips Swing Is the Thing! (2000)
 John Pizzarelli Dear Mr. Cole (1994)
 Lisa Pollard I See Your Face Before Me (1993)
 Clark Terry One on One (2000)
 Steve Turre Right There (1991)
 Belinda Underwood Greenspace (2008)
 Bobby Watson Inventor (1989)

References

External links 
Official site

American jazz pianists
American male pianists
1963 births
Living people
Musicians from New York City
City of Toronto's Glenn Gould Protégé Prize winners
Criss Cross Jazz artists
Blue Note Records artists
Telarc Records artists
The Jazz Messengers members
Musicians from Berkeley, California
Berkeley High School (Berkeley, California) alumni
University of Michigan faculty
20th-century American pianists
Jazz musicians from New York (state)
American male jazz musicians
Sunnyside Records artists
Jazz musicians from California